The New Adventures of Mighty Mouse and Heckle & Jeckle is a 1979–1980 television series featuring newly produced Mighty Mouse and Heckle & Jeckle cartoons.  The series was produced by Filmation, and aired from 1979 to 1980 on CBS with 96 episodes (128 if counting the educational "Nature" and "Homonyms" segments, hosted by Mighty and Heckle and Jeckle respectively) produced. It was the second Mighty Mouse cartoon series, following the original Mighty Mouse Playhouse from 1955 to 1967, and followed by Mighty Mouse: The New Adventures, which aired from 1987 to 1988.

Each hour of The New Adventures of Mighty Mouse and Heckle & Jeckle consisted of two Mighty Mouse cartoons, two Heckle and Jeckle cartoons, one Quacula cartoon, and one episode of the 16-part science fiction serial The Great Space Chase. Also included was "Mighty Mouse Environmental Bulletins" and Heckle & Jeckle's "Homonyms" (to add a little educational karma).

The show was shortened to a half-hour in 1980, and was moved to Sundays in its final season. In 1982, The Great Space Chase was re-edited into an 80-minute movie which had a limited release to theaters. It later appeared on home video.

In this show, Oil Can Harry has a bumbling assistant, Swifty, a fat cat that can still run extremely fast.

Voice actors and their characters
 Alan Oppenheimer – Mighty Mouse,  Oil Can Harry, Swifty, Narrator, Additional Voices
 Diane Pershing – Pearl Pureheart, Additional Voices
 Frank Welker – Heckle & Jeckle, Quacula, Additional Voices
 Norm Prescott – Theodore H. Bear, Additional Voices

Episodes

References

External links
 
 

1979 American television series debuts
1981 American television series endings
1970s American animated television series
1980s American animated television series
American children's animated action television series
American children's animated adventure television series
American children's animated comedy television series
American children's animated fantasy television series
American children's animated superhero television series
Animated television series about mice and rats
English-language television shows
CBS original programming
Terrytoons
Television series by Filmation
Television series by CBS Studios
Vampires in animated television